The 1999 Nigerian Senate election in Akwa Ibom State was held on February 20, 1999, to elect members of the Nigerian Senate to represent Akwa Ibom State. Udoma Udo Udoma representing Akwa Ibom South, John James Akpan Udo-Edehe representing Akwa Ibom North-East and Bob Ittak Ekarika representing Akwa Ibom North-West all won on the platform of the Peoples Democratic Party.

Overview

Summary

Results

Akwa Ibom South 
The election was won by Udoma Udo Udoma of the Peoples Democratic Party.

Akwa Ibom North-East 
The election was won by Effiong Dickson Bob of the Peoples Democratic Party.

Akwa Ibom North-West 
The election was won by Bob Ittak Ekarika of the Peoples Democratic Party.

References 

Akw
Akwa Ibom State Senate elections
February 1999 events in Nigeria